Budince is a village and municipality in Michalovce District in the Kosice Region of eastern Slovakia.

History
In historical records the village was first mentioned in 1332.

Geography
The village lies at an altitude of 106 metres and covers an area of  (2020-06-30/-07-01).

Ethnicity
The population is almost entirely Hungarian in ethnicity.

Population 
It has a population of 220 people (2020-12-31).

Government

The village relies on the tax and district offices, police force and fire brigade at Veľké Kapušany

Genealogical resources

The records for genealogical research are available at the state archive "Statny Archiv in Presov, Slovakia"

 Greek Catholic church records (births/marriages/deaths): 1813-1875 (parish B)
 Reformated church records (births/marriages/deaths): 1767-1832 (parish B)

See also
 List of municipalities and towns in Slovakia

References

External links
https://web.archive.org/web/20071217080336/http://www.statistics.sk/mosmis/eng/run.html
Surnames of living people in Budince

Villages and municipalities in Michalovce District